is an adult-themed dating sim series created by ELF Corporation.  The original Dōkyūsei, originally released in 1992 for the NEC PC-9801 microcomputer, is generally considered to be the forerunner of the modern dating sim.  It was followed by sequels: Dōkyūsei 2 and Kakyūsei (下級生, meaning Lower Classmates), both of which were also very successful.  There was a four-episode OAV made from Dōkyūsei, a 12-episode OAV was made from Dōkyūsei 2, and both an OAV and TV series from Kakyūsei. In 2004, ELF released the next in the series of games, Kakyūsei 2.

A Game Boy Color mahjong game with Dōkyūsei 1 characters called Jankyūsei (雀級生) was also created. The Dōkyūsei 2 expansion disk (Nanpa 2 Special), Dōkyūsei 2 SP, was also made into an OVA, this expansion is also referred to as Sotsugyōsei (卒業生, meaning The Graduate).

Despite its title, most of the girl characters are not classmates of the main character.

References

External links
 Brief history of Dōkyūsei and Kakyūsei (archive article)
 
 
 
 

1999 anime television series debuts
ELF Corporation games
Eroge
Pink Pineapple
Video game franchises introduced in 1992